Michel A. Ball (born September 17, 1954) is a Republican member of the Alabama House of Representatives. Ball has been in the state house since 2002.

Biography
Ball was born in Stockton, California. He has a bachelor's degree from Athens State University. He was a State Trooper and then part of the Alabama Bureau of Investigations before entering politics. Ball is a Methodist.

External links
Project Vote Smart bio

1954 births
American United Methodists
American state police officers
Athens State University alumni
Law enforcement in Alabama
Living people
Republican Party members of the Alabama House of Representatives
People from Madison, Alabama
Politicians from Stockton, California
United States Marine Corps officers
21st-century American politicians
Military personnel from California